Campiglossa stenoptera is a species of fruit fly in the family Tephritidae.

Distribution
The species is found in Italy.

References

Tephritinae
Insects described in 1862
Diptera of Europe
Taxa named by Hermann Loew